Wilhelm Friedrich Boger (19 December 1906  – 3 April 1977) known as "The Tiger of Auschwitz"  was a German police commissioner and concentration camp overseer. He was infamous for the appalling crimes which he had committed at Auschwitz under the command of the camp's Gestapo chief Maximilian Grabner.

Early life
Born in Zuffenhausen near Stuttgart, Germany, as the son of a merchant Boger joined the HJ (Hitler youth) in his teens. After finishing high school ("Mittlere Reife") in 1922 he learned the trade of his father over the next 3 years and in 1925 took an office job in Stuttgart at the  "Deutsch-Nationalen Handlungsgehilfenverband". He entered the Artamanen-Bund, a völkisch agrarian movement, and joined the Nazi Party in 1929. He was a member of the general SS beginning in 1930. After losing his job in 1932 he was admitted to the Auxiliary Police at Friedrichshafen and in July 1933 to the political police ("Bereitschaftspolizei") in Stuttgart. From 1936 to 37 he attended the police training school. He was appointed Police Commissioner ("Kriminalsekretär") after passing the police force examination in 1937, even though he had been taken into custody in 1936 for mistreating a prisoner during an interrogation in 1936.

World War II
At the beginning of the Second World War he was transferred to the state police lead office at Zichenau. Three weeks later he was placed in charge of setting up and supervising the border police station in Ostrołęka. In 1940 he joined the 2nd SS and Police Engineer reserve unit ("Polizeipioniersbataillion") based in Dresden, from where he was dispatched to the front and subsequently wounded in 1942. Nine months later he was transferred to Auschwitz, first serving as Zugführer der 2. Wachkompanie, later as Untersturmführer (Second Lieutenant) in the Auschwitz political department. The Political Department was the representative of the RSHA in the camp, and its chief responsibilities were keeping files on individual prisoners, the reception of prisoners, maintaining the security of the camp, combating internal resistance and conducting interrogations. From 23 December 1943 until the evacuation of the camp he was the leader of the section of investigations and interrogations with the rank of SS-Hauptsturmführer.

Auschwitz
Wilhelm Boger invented the "Boger swing", an instrument of torture. Reported after the war by his secretary, Frau Braun:

It was a meter-long iron bar suspended by chains hung from the ceiling ... A prisoner would be brought in for "questioning," stripped naked and bent over the bar, wrists manacled to ankles. A guard at one side would shove him—or her—off across the chamber in a long, slow arc, while Boger would ask "questions," at first quietly, then barking them out, and at the last bellowing. At each return, another guard armed with a crowbar would smash the victim across the buttocks. As the swinging went on and on, and the wailing victim fainted, was revived only to faint howling again, the blows continued—until only a mass of bleeding pulp hung before their eyes. Most perished from the ordeal--some sooner, some later. In the end a sack  bones and flayed flesh and fat was swept along the shambles of that concrete floor to be dragged away.

Post-war
His atrocious crimes in the Political Department continued until the evacuation of Auschwitz in January 1945. Boger was detained by American military police on 19 June 1945, in Ludwigsburg, where his parents were living. He should have been extradited to Poland for trial but managed to escape from custody in November 1946. From 1948 until mid 1949, he was working as a farm hand in Crailsheim. He then lived with his family under his proper name in Hemmingen near Leonberg. He found a job as supervisor of supplies at the Heinkelwerke, an airplane factory in his birthplace Stuttgart-Zuffenhausen, where he was apprehended in October 1958 at the age of 51. He had heretofore led a withdrawn life; when acquaintances or neighbors asked him about his activities at KZ Auschwitz, he would reply that he had done nothing worthy of regret (er habe sich nichts vorzuwerfen).

He passed denazification. The particular organ of justice ("Spruchkammer") by which he was processed in Stuttgart found " ... He does not leave the impression of a raw, brutal man, but more one of a rational, well-schooled police commissioner and civil servant ... " and stopped the investigation because of the costs to be borne by the government should the investigation continue.

Frankfurt Auschwitz Trials
In 1959 he was arrested for the last time, and this time was charged for the war crimes he committed at Auschwitz. On 20 August 1965 he became part of the Frankfurt Auschwitz Trials by the Landgericht Frankfurt am Main under Chief Judge Hans Hofmeyer for aiding and abetting the murder of Jews. After a series of eyewitness testimonies he was finally sentenced to life imprisonment with hard labour for murder in at least 114 cases and an accessory to murder in at least 1000 cases. In his final statement to the court, Boger downplayed his personal guilt, but admitted that Nazism was wrong.During the National Socialist regime, the only point of view for me was to carry out the orders given by my superiors without restriction. I was sent to Auschwitz through no fault of my own - I don't want to refer to it. Today I see that the idea I clung to was ruinous and wrong. I don't want to sugarcoat anything. I want to leave no doubt that the "tightened interrogations," as ordered, were carried out by me. At the time, however, the focus of my reflections was not on Auschwitz as the cruel place of extermination of European Jewry, but solely on combating the Polish resistance movement and Bolshevism.

Death
He died at the age of 70 in the prison at Bietigheim-Bissingen, Baden-Württemberg, Germany on 3 April 1977, 18 years after his arrest and trial.

References

External links
Newsreel footage showing model of Boger Swing

1906 births
1977 deaths
People from the Kingdom of Württemberg
SS-Hauptsturmführer
Auschwitz concentration camp personnel
People from Stuttgart
Gestapo personnel
German people convicted of murder
German prisoners sentenced to life imprisonment
Holocaust perpetrators in Poland
Romani genocide perpetrators
Waffen-SS personnel
Nazis who died in prison custody
People convicted in the Frankfurt Auschwitz trials
Prisoners sentenced to life imprisonment by Germany
Prisoners who died in German detention
German prisoners of war in World War II held by the United States